Fearon Publishers is an American publishing company based in Belmont, California. This publishing company mainly deals with parenting and education books.

References

Book publishing companies based in the San Francisco Bay Area
Companies based in San Mateo County, California